American actress, singer and songwriter Ashley Tisdale has recorded material for two studio albums,  eleven soundtrack albums and promotional campaigns. In 2006, Tisdale was cast as the popular, narcissistic high school student Sharpay Evans in the film High School Musical.  The soundtrack, in which Tisdale lent her vocals for several songs, became the top-selling album in the United States that year. Tisdale became the first female artist to debut with two songs simultaneously on the Billboard Hot 100 chart with "What I've Been Looking For" and "Bop to the Top", both tracks from the film's soundtrack.

Due to the popularity earned by Tisdale through her performance in High School Musical, Warner Bros. Records signed her for a recording contract in July 2006. Tisdale then began to work on her debut studio album Headstrong, which was released in February 2007. For the album, she co-wrote the track "Over It", the bonus track "It's Life" and the singles "Not Like That" and "Suddenly". The success of the first High School Musical film led Tisdale to reprise the role in the film's two sequels and spin-off, recording several tracks for the soundtracks. In 2008, Tisdale recorded covers of popular songs from the 1980s and 1990s to promote a deodorant by Degree. The following year, Tisdale released her second studio album Guilty Pleasure. The tracks "It's Alright, It's OK" and "Crank It Up" were released as singles. She also worked as a co-writer on the album, having writing credits in the promotional singles "Acting Out", "Overrated" and "What If", and the tracks "Me Without You" and "Whatcha Waiting For".

Songs

See also
 Ashley Tisdale discography

References

External links
The Official Ashley Tisdale site

List
Tisdale, Ashley